Adão Dãxalebaradã (1955–2004) was a Brazilian singer and actor.  His work revolves around Afro-Brazilian religions, and he composed about 500 songs on the subject. His stage name, "Xalebaradã" means "beginning, middle and end" in Yoruba.

Compositions
Africa
Weapons & Peace
Weapons & Peace (remix)
Woa Lobi Bibi
Computer
Deus é um Negrão
Diamond
Scholasticism
Ilalaa
Luanda
Life curta
Curta Life (remix)
Life curta
Xirê

20th-century Brazilian male singers
20th-century Brazilian singers
Brazilian male actors
1955 births
2004 deaths